Brian "Chookie" Vogler (30 May 1932 in Ipswich, Queensland – 6 May 2009 in Gold Coast, Queensland)  was an Australian international footballer and coal miner.

Biography
He spent his childhood in North Ipswich attending local Catholic schools before becoming a coal miner, a profession he followed for 43 years.

Vogler began his sporting career as a professional rugby league footballer before switching to football. He played senior football in Queensland for Blackstone and Hellenic during the 1950s and 1960s. Later he would be a competitive cricketer and lawn bowler.

Although selected in the Australian squad that competed at the 1956 Melbourne Olympic Games, Brian didn't make his international debut until after the Games in a friendly match against India at the Sydney Sports Ground in December of the same year.

Vogler, Socceroo number 158, scored on debut in a 1–7 loss to the Indians. He played two more matches for Australia against New Zealand in 1958 scoring his second A-international goal at Carlaw Park in a 2-all draw. In 1959 he scored again for Australia in a B-International against a touring Heart of Midlothian team. In later life he was a competitive lawn bowler.

Personal life
Married to Margaret. They had six children: Mark, Gary, Christine, Peter (an Australian representative in baseball at two Olympics), Matthew and Anne.

References

External links
 Brian Vogler Farewelled
 Former Socceroo Dies, Aged 76
 

1932 births
Australian soccer players
Australia international soccer players
Olympic soccer players of Australia
Footballers at the 1956 Summer Olympics
2009 deaths
Association football midfielders